BS 7799 was a standard originally published by BSI Group (BSI) in 1995. It was written by the United Kingdom Government's Department of Trade and Industry (DTI), and consisted of several parts.

The first part, containing the best practices for Information Security Management, was revised in 1998; after a lengthy discussion in the worldwide standards bodies, was eventually adopted by ISO/IEC as ISO/IEC 17799, "Information Technology - Code of practice for information security management." in 2000.  ISO/IEC 17799 was then revised in June 2005 and finally incorporated in the ISO 27000 series of standards as ISO/IEC 27002 in July 2007.

The second part to BS 7799 was first published by BSI in 1999, known as BS 7799 Part 2, titled "Information Security Management Systems - Specification with guidance for use." BS 7799-2 focused on how to implement an information security management system (ISMS), referring to the information security management structure and controls identified in BS 7799-2, which later became ISO/IEC 27001. The 2002 version of BS 7799-2 introduced the Plan-Do-Check-Act (PDCA) (Deming quality assurance model), aligning it with quality standards such as ISO 9000.  BS 7799 Part 2 was adopted by ISO as ISO/IEC 27001 in November 2005.

BS 7799 Part 3 was published in 2005, covering risk analysis and management. It aligns with ISO/IEC 27001.  It was revised in 2017.

See also
Cyber security standards
 ISO/IEC 27000-series
 ISO/IEC 27001
 ISO/IEC 27002 (formerly ISO/IEC 17799)

References

External links
 British Standards Institution -> BSI Shop
 Certificate register
 BS 7799 Part 2 PDCA Methodology

07799
Computer security standards